Sit Down, Shut Up may refer to:
Sit Down, Shut Up (2001 TV series), an Australian live-action sitcom
Sit Down, Shut Up (2009 TV series), an American animated series
Sit Down and Shut Up: Punk Rock Commentaries on Buddha, God, Truth, Sex, Death, & Dogen's Treasury of the Right Dharma Eye, a 2007 book by Brad Warner